Badminton at the 2019 Parapan American Games in Lima, Peru from 29 August to 1 September. This is the debut appearance of badminton to be in the Parapan Games, this event will act as a qualifier to add points on the Road to Tokyo 2020 qualification where para badminton will also make its first appearance.

Participating nations
There are 36 male and 16 female players from 11 nations participating.

 (Host country)

Medal table

Medalists

See also
Badminton at the 2019 Pan American Games
Badminton at the 2020 Summer Paralympics

References

2019 Parapan American Games
Parapanamerican Games
Badminton tournaments in Peru